Clyde Burghs, also known as Glasgow Burghs, was a district of burghs constituency of the House of Commons of Great Britain (at Westminster) from 1708 to 1801 and of the House of Commons of the United Kingdom (also at Westminster) from 1801 to 1832.  It elected one Member of Parliament (MP).

Creation
The British parliamentary constituency was created in 1708 following the Acts of Union, 1707 and replaced the former Parliament of Scotland burgh constituencies of Glasgow, Dumbarton,  Renfrew and Rutherglen.

Boundaries 

The constituency consisted of parliamentary burghs along the River Clyde and the Firth of Clyde: Dumbarton in the county of Dumbarton, Glasgow and Rutherglen in the county of Lanark, and Renfrew in the county of Renfrew.

History
The constituency elected one Member of Parliament (MP) by the first past the post system until the seat was abolished for the 1832 general election.

When the district of burghs constituency was abolished in 1832 the Glasgow parliamentary burgh was merged into the then new two-member Glasgow constituency. The Dumbarton, Renfrew and Rutherglen burghs were combined with Kilmarnock burgh and Port Glasgow burgh in the then-new Kilmarnock Burghs constituency.

Members of Parliament

References 

1708 establishments in Scotland
Constituencies of the Parliament of the United Kingdom established in 1708
Constituencies of the Parliament of the United Kingdom disestablished in 1832
Historic parliamentary constituencies in Scotland (Westminster)
History of Glasgow
History of Renfrewshire
History of South Lanarkshire
History of West Dunbartonshire
Politics of Glasgow
Politics of Renfrewshire
Politics of South Lanarkshire
Politics of West Dunbartonshire